The discography of Baroness, an American heavy metal band, consists of five studio albums, one live album, one compilation album, five extended plays (EPs), eight singles and eight music videos. Formed in Savannah, Georgia in 2003, the group was originally composed of vocalist and guitarist John Baizley, guitarist Tim Loose, bassist Summer Welch and drummer Allen Blickle. Signed with Hyperrealist Records, the band released their first two EPs in 2004 and 2005, simply titled First and Second. A Grey Sigh in a Flower Husk, featuring two tracks by Baroness and four by fellow Savannah-based band Unpersons, was released in July 2007. After Loose was replaced by Brian Blickle, the band released its debut full-length studio album Red Album through Relapse Records in September 2007.

A second change of guitarist followed in September 2008, when Blickle left after just two years in the band and was replaced by Pete Adams. After the first two Baroness EPs were issued together as First & Second in December 2008, the group's second album Blue Record was released in October 2009. It was the band's first release to chart, reaching number 117 on the US Billboard 200 and topping the Heatseekers Albums chart. Welch left Baroness in April 2012 and was replaced by Matt Maggioni, although he was not featured on the band's third album, with all bass performed by Baizley. Yellow & Green, released in July 2012, reached number 30 on the Billboard 200, while lead single "Take My Bones Away" registered at number 38 on the Billboard Mainstream Rock Songs chart.

In August 2012, while on tour to promote Yellow & Green, Baroness were involved in a bus crash which resulted in injuries keeping Baizley, Blickle and Maggioni hospitalized for several weeks. Shortly after the group announced they would be returning to touring, Blickle and Maggioni announced that they would be leaving. The departed members were later replaced by Nick Jost (on bass) and Sebastian Thomson (on drums). The group released its fourth album Purple in December 2015. The album reached number 70 on the Billboard 200, while second single "Shock Me" registered at number 28 on the Mainstream Rock Songs chart.

Albums

Studio albums

Live albums

Compilations

Extended plays

Singles

Music videos

References

External links
Baroness official website
Baroness discography at AllMusic
Baroness discography at Discogs
Baroness discography at MusicBrainz

Baroness
Baroness